Hurricane Enrique was a high-end category 1 hurricane that brought heavy rainfall and flooding to the southwestern Mexico, causing $50 million damages (2021 USD) and two direct deaths. The system also threatened the Baja California Peninsula as a tropical storm; however, it became a remnant low prior to affecting the region. Enrique was the fifth depression and named storm, as well as the first hurricane of the 2021 Pacific hurricane season. A tropical wave over the Pacific Ocean near Nicaragua started to produce large amounts of unorganized thunderstorms by June 22. In an environment conducive for intensification, the disturbance traveled west-northwestward and on 09:00 UTC of June 25, advisories were issued on Tropical Storm Enrique as an advanced scatterometer pass on the system showed gale-force winds were present on the system's southeast quadrant. The system further organized under an area of warm waters and low wind shear while continuing its motion, slowing by 21:00 UTC of that day before strengthening to a Category 1 hurricane and turning northwestward. As it neared the coast of Mexico, Enrique's strengthening trend halted as dry air started to impact the system. An eye feature started to appear on visible satellite imagery by June 26 as it turned northwest.

Meteorological history

On June 20, NHC noted a possible formation of a low-pressure area near the south of Guatemala and Gulf of Tehuantepec. On June 22, an area of disturbed weather was tracking over Central America with satellite imagery indicating disorganized showers and thunderstorms. With conductive environmental conditions, the system gradually organized and on June 25 at 09:00 UTC, the NHC assessed the system as a tropical storm, assigning the name Enrique. Satellite imagery also revealed that the storm had developed a low-level circulation, with a scatterometer pass over the storm also showing that it was producing tropical storm-force winds to the southeast of the center. The storm's structure had further improved six hours later, with prominent banding features to the south and east. Later, a large convective burst developed over the storm. Enrique continued to intensify throughout the day, with the NHC assessing the system to have strengthened into a category 1 hurricane by 09:00 UTC on June 26, after which the system possessed a well-defined central dense overcast and alongside persistent area of cold cloud tops. An area of overshooting cloud tops signaled that the eyewall was developing. However, its structure degraded shortly afterward due to dry air. Enrique's structure improved later, though dry air still was being entrained into the storm's northern side. Slight additional intensification was forecast, but this did not occur. On June 28, at 15:00UTC the convective structure of Enrique had been eroded with the inner core becoming increasingly ragged due to dry air, causing the hurricane to weaken. On the same day at 21:00UTC the NHC downgraded Enrique to a high end tropical storm as the structure continued to deteriorate and had a partially exposed center. On June 30, at 12:00 UTC, the NHC further downgraded Enrique to a tropical depression as its thunderstorms shrunk to a small area of deep convection. On 21:00 UTC that day, Enrique degenerated into a remnant low in the Gulf of California as all of its convection had dissipated.

Preparations and impact
At 15:00 UTC on June 25, a Tropical Storm Watch was issued by the Government of Mexico from Punta San Telmo, Michoacán to Cabo Corrientes, Jalisco.

At least two people drowned at a beach in Pie de la Cuesta, Guerrero due to rip currents between June 25–26. At least 207 homes were damaged by landslides and winds caused by Enrique in Guerrero. Heavy rain impacted areas of Manzanillo, while winds caused minor damage to homes. In Lazaro Cardenas, areas were inundated by more than 50 cm (19 in) of floodwater. A total of 115,904 customers lost power across the state of Jalisco, although power was restored to 96% within a couple of hours later. Enrique left damage in parts of Nayarit, with trees being uprooted and falling onto homes and power lines being knocked down, leading to a citywide power outage in Tepic. Nationwide, damage from the storm was estimated to be approximately US$50 million.

See also

Weather of 2021
Tropical cyclones in 2021
List of Category 1 Pacific hurricanes
Other storms of the same name
Hurricane Lorena (2019)
Tropical Storm Hernan (2020)

References

External links

 The National Hurricane Center's advisory archive on Hurricane Enrique

Category 1 Pacific hurricanes
2021 Pacific hurricane season
2021 in Mexico